Sham Shui Po Police Station situated at the junction of Lai Chi Kok Road and Yen Chow Street, Sham Shui Po. It was built in 1924 with three storeys. It is graded as Grade III historic building.

The police station is adjacent to former Sham Shui Po Camp and later Dragon Centre.

History
Shortly after the British executed the 99-year lease of the New Territory, a police station, also served as the Harbour Master’s Station, was built at Sham Shui Po. British established a base at Sham Shui Po with military camps and police stations as it overlooked the western side of the Victoria Harbour. The current Sham Shui Po Police Station building was completed in 1924 to replace the older station at the area.

The building was built before World War II for a small population, before the rapid industrial and residential development of the area after the war. In addition, a large influx of immigrants from mainland China, settling in the area after the war, caused the district to become one of the worst squatter areas in Hong Kong. Therefore, the station underwent a series of additions and alterations to cater for its growing need for personnel and facilities.

Sham Shui Po Station is still serving its community today even though its role changed from the station for the whole district to a sub-station in 1967.

See also
 Historic police station buildings in Hong Kong

References

External links 
 

Infrastructure completed in 1924
Police stations in Hong Kong
Sham Shui Po
Grade III historic buildings in Hong Kong